Nerea Elizalde Zamakona (born June 18, 1998, Bilbao, Spain) is a Spanish film, theater and television actress, singer and dancer. She is known for playing Nerea Vidal in the Spanish television series Si fueras tú.

Life and career 

She studied secondary education (lower and upper) at the Karmelo-Solokoetxe School (high school) in Bilbao.

Later, she studied and trained in theater and drama in Ánima Eskola School of Drama with David Valdelvira, Marina Shimanskaya and Algis Arlauskas, training as a method actress, under the Stanislavsky-M.Chekhov-Grotowski-Vakhtangov methodology (Russian method), following the methodologies of the Russian classical school. There she coincided with the actors Carmen Climent and Julen Guerrero, together with whom she was trained. She also trained with Agentinian stage director and drama teacher Juan Carlos Corazza.

She was also trained in music and dance since she was little and also in singing. She studied music and music theory with Roberto Bienzobas. She studied dance with Rakel Rodríguez. She plays the trikitixa.

In 2014 she performed the play A Midsummer Night's Dream by William Shakespeare, playing the role of Helena, a theatrical production at the Campos Elíseos Theatre, directed by Spanish stage director David Valdelvira, together with Carmen Climent and Julen Guerrero, among other cast members. The stage production was awarded the Buero Vallejo Award (2015), in the XII edition of the awards. She was part of the Ánima Youth Theatre.

In 2015 she performed the play Dialogues between Chekhov and Bécquer, a theatrical production at the Campos Elíseos Theatre, directed by Russian actress and stage director Marina Shimanskaya, based on the works of Anton Chejov and Gustavo Adolfo Bécquer.

From 2010 to 2017 she worked in more than 10 plays. In 2016, she joined the Pabellón 6 youth theater company in Bilbao, where she won an award for best actress in 2016 for the micro-theatre A small step for man. She has been part of different theatrical productions in different parts of Spain, such as Último tren a Treblinka directed by Mireia Gabilondo.

Since 2017, she has played the character of Nerea Vidal in the series Si fueras tú on La 1 along with Maria Pedraza and Oscar Casas.

In 2020, she joined the cast of the ETB1 series Go!azen, playing the character of Garazi.

Filmography

Television

Film

Stage

Awards and nominations

Buero Vallejo Awards

See also 

 Marina Shimanskaya
 David Valdelvira
 Carmen Climent
 Ánima Eskola School of Drama

References

External links 
 

1998 births
Living people
People from Bilbao
21st-century Spanish actresses
Spanish film actresses
Spanish television actresses
Spanish stage actresses
Ánima Eskola School of Drama alumni